Luana María Alonso Méndez (born 19 March 2004) is a Paraguayan swimmer. She competed in the women's 100 metre butterfly event of the 2020 Summer Olympics. She holds multiple Paraguayan records in the butterfly discipline.

References

External links
 Virginia Tech Hokies bio
 

2004 births
Living people
Swimmers at the 2020 Summer Olympics
Paraguayan female swimmers
Olympic swimmers of Paraguay
21st-century Paraguayan women
Virginia Tech Hokies women's swimmers
Sportspeople from Asunción